The Spain women's national under-17 football team represents Spain in international football in under-17 categories and is controlled by the Royal Spanish Football Federation. The youth team has reached the World Cup Finals on three occasions (2014, 2018 and 2022), winning back to back in the last two. It has also won bronze medals on the 2010 and 2016 editions. All these achievements have made Spain the most successful team in World Cup under their category.

On European Cup the team has reached a total of 8 finals. Becoming champions on 4 occasions and becoming runners-up on 4. Thus making them one of the most successful teams in the under-17 category.

Recent schedule and results

This list includes match results from the past 12 months, as well as any future matches that have been scheduled.

Legend

2021

2022

2023

Players

Current squad
The following players have been called up for the 2022 UEFA Women's Under-17 Championship
Caps and goals as of 16 May 2022.

Recent call-ups

Previous rosters
2010 FIFA U-17 Women's World Cup squad
2014 FIFA U-17 Women's World Cup squad
2016 FIFA U-17 Women's World Cup squad
2018 FIFA U-17 Women's World Cup squad

Statistics

Top Appearances

Those marked in bold went on to earn full international caps

Top Goalscorers

Those marked in bold went on to earn full international caps

Hat-tricks

4 Player scored 4 goals 
5 Player scored 5 goals 
6 Player scored 6 goals 
7 Player scored 7 goals

Competitive record

FIFA U-17 Women's World Cup record

UEFA Women's Under-17 Championship

See also
Spain women's national football team
Spain women's national under-19 football team
Spain women's national under-20 football team
Spain women's national under-23 football team

Notes

References

External links
Spain women's national under-17 football team at UEFA.com

Women's national under-17 association football teams
European women's national under-17 association football teams
Football